In Hinduism, Vamadeva is the preserving aspect of the God Shiva, one of six aspects of the universe he embodies, as well as the name of an ancient rishi. On a five-faced Shivalingam, Vamadeva appears on the right hand side. This face/aspect of Śiva is considered the peaceful, graceful and poetic one — the lord of the female aspect of it is associated with water.

The Brahman or parashiva splits into male (shiva) and female (Parasakti) and manifests as the universe. Then sadashiva comes he has five faces: 
 Sadyojata – west-aspect that propagates manifest Brahman; associated with Brahma;  represents water (Bhava).
 Tatpurusha – east-aspect that conceals; associated with Maheshwara, Rishi, Muni, Jnani, yogi; represents light (rudra) and moon (Mahadeva).
 Vamadeva – north-aspect that sustains manifest Brahman; associated with Vishnu; represents air or vital life force (Ugra).
 Isana – upper-aspect that reveals; associated with Sadashiva, Rishi, Muni, Jnani, yogi; represents sky (Bheema) and sun (Ishana).
 Aghora – south-aspect that rejuvenates manifest Brahman; associated with Rudra; represents earth (Sharva).
 Adhomukha – lower-aspect that enjoy manifest Brahman; associated with shanmukha;  represents fire (Pashupati).

Name
As a God's name, it is a karmadharaya and means "beautiful God".

As a man's name, it is probably a bahuvrihi and means "he whose God is beautiful".

Origin

Brahma created Vamadevas, after he saw, that manasputras (the 10 sages), created by him, are not focused on creation and instead focused on meditation and ascese. Vamadeva (Rudras) created lightning, thunderbolt, clouds, rainbows, varieties of medicines all of which are immortals. They are also known as Rudras as they created immortals. Brahma then request Rudras (Vamadeva) to only create the mortals and not the immortals. Rudra (Vamdeva) saying that they could only create the immortals, stopped the work of creation.

Eleven Rudras(Vamadeva) were created by Brahma, each carry Trishula in their hand. The eleven Vamadeva(Rudras) are Ajaykapada, Ahirbudhanya, Virukapsa, Raivata, Hara, Bahurupa, Triambaka, Savitra, Jayanta, Pinaki and Aparajita.

The name Rudra figuratively means immortal is generally associated with Shiva. Unlike Sadyojata, Vamadeva is considered as the embodiment of power over elements of creation and further expansion of that which is created.

'Represents Citta rūpa and Citta rūpiṇi of Śiva. This is Turīya, attained by getting acquainted with primordial energy of the sun. This face of Śiva has special powers to heal both mentally and physically of any creature. Represents Parāliṅga. Two billion (200,00,000)  mantras are trying to describe this face of Śiva. Blood red in color it represents unmatched force that is capable of transforming all elements of the cosmos. Uplifts the element of Tejasa. Direction is North. Predominates the energy of vital life force. It represents indescribable amount of brightness of light. Only those established in yoga can contain it within their physical forms, otherwise the mortal frame sheds itself immediately resulting in union with Vamadeva. The adepts contain the energy of creation of elements within themselves. (Rig Veda Samhita, Chaturtha Mandala, Vamadeva)''Vamadeva Rishi
Vamadeva is also the name of a rishi, credited with most of Mandala 4 of the Rigveda. He is mentioned prominently in the Upanishads as well, particularly the Brihadaranyaka and Aitareya. His father was Gautama Maharishi, said to be one of the Saptarishi or seven great sages, and his brother Nodhas also has hymns in the Rigveda.

Vamadeva Rishi in Buddhism
In multiple places in the early Buddhist texts, such as the Vinaya Pitaka of the Mahavagga (I.245) section the Buddha lists the ancient Vedic rishis "Atthako, Vâmako, Vâmadevo''', Vessâmitto, Yamataggi, Angiraso, Bhâradvâjo, Vâsettho, Kassapo, and Bhagu". He consistently rejects the authority of the Vedas and the ancient seers, comparing them to a line of blind men.

See also
Vamanadeva

Further readingDictionary of Hindu Lore and Legend'' by Anna Dallapiccola

References

Forms of Shiva